Dag Nätterqvist (20 June 1922 – 20 November 2009) was a Swedish equestrian.

Career
He competed in jumping (horse) at the 1960 Summer Olympics, but failed to win a medal.

Personal life
His son Ted and his wife Pia Levin Nätterqvist were also competitive equestrian jumpers. His grandson Joakim is a Swedish actor, theatre director, singer and songwriter and acting coach.

References

1922 births
2009 deaths
Olympic equestrians of Sweden
Swedish male equestrians
Equestrians at the 1960 Summer Olympics
Sportspeople from Stockholm
20th-century Swedish people